The Adlerstein is a 676-metre-high summit in the Saxon Ore Mountains near Lengefeld. At the top there is a historic triangulation station which was part of the Royal Saxon triangulation network.

Location and area 
The Adlerstein lies in the Central Ore Mountains not far from the B 101 federal road that runs from Heinzebank to Pockau where there is a junction with the Lengefeld Road not far away. Immediately at the foot of the mountain is the well-known Lengefeld Lime Works (Kalkwerk Lengefeld). The Adlerstein and the nearby peak of the Lauterbacher Knochen complement one another as good viewing points, albeit partly obscured by trees in places.

Views 
The other places that may be seen from the Adlerstein include the Sayda and Brand Heights, Waldkirchen, Marienberg, Dittersdorfer Höhe and Pöhlberg in Germany, and the Jelení hora (Haßberg), Hora Svaté Kateřiny (Katharinaberg) and the Čihadlo (Lauschhübei) in the Czech Republic.

Sources 
 

Pockau-Lengefeld
Mountains of Saxony
Mountains of the Ore Mountains
Mountains under 1000 metres